Iosif Grigor’evich Langbard, also Josef Langbard (6 January 1882 in Bielsk Podlaski, Grodno Governorate – 3 January 1951 in Leningrad) was a Soviet Belarusian architect and Honored Artist of the Byelorussian SSR (1934).

Langbard studied architecture at the Grekov Odessa Art school in 1901 and then St. Petersburg Academy of Arts (1907-1914), and later returned there to teach becoming a professor from 1939-1950. He was the architect of many of most important Soviet-era buildings in Minsk. Langbard also worked on buildings in Kyiv after it became the Ukrainian capital, such as the building of the Ministry of Foreign Affairs of Ukraine.

Works
 Monument to Taras Shevchenko

Gallery

References

External links 
 Berkovich, Gary. Reclaiming a History. Jewish Architects in Imperial Russia and the USSR. Volume 2. Soviet Avant-garde: 1917–1933. Weimar und Rostock: Grunberg Verlag. 2021. P. 162 
 Архитектор Иосиф Григорьевич Лангбард (1882—1951). К 125- летию со дня рождения 
 Биографическая статья в журнале «Мишпоха» 
 Творчество архитектора И. Г. Лангбарда 
 Архитектор Иосиф Лангбард 
 ТРУДОВАЯ КНИЖКА ИОСИФА ЛАНГБАРДА, ИЛИ ИСТОРИЯ О ТОМ, КАК В МИНСК ВЕРНУЛСЯ АРХИВ ЛЕГЕНДАРНОГО ЗОДЧЕГО 
 Дом офицеров в Минске. История и настоящее  

1882 births
1951 deaths
People from Bielsk Podlaski
People from Belsky Uyezd (Grodno Governorate)
Jews from the Russian Empire
Belarusian architects
Soviet architects
Burials at Serafimovskoe Cemetery
Residents of the Benois House